Scythris falciformis is a moth of the family Scythrididae. It was described by Bengt Å. Bengtsson in 2014. It is found in Kenya.

The larvae have been recorded feeding on Acacia tortilis and Acacia mellifera.

References

falciformis
Moths described in 2014